Oguwike Emeka is a Nigerian player who plays for Myanmar National League club Hanthawaddy United
as a striker.

Career

Early years

Emeka  started his career at Aonike Academy at the age of five years in Nigeria and transferred to Vietnam Club Nam Định F.C. in 2012, and then he played for  Đồng Tháp F.C., Ho Chi Minh FC for one season each. Then he moved to Laos Clubs – Eastern Star FC for one season and transferred to NUOL fc for one season earning 23 goals.

Yangon United
Emeka signed  for Yangon united in December 2016. He played his first match for the club on 15 January 2017 against Magwe and scored a brace.

References

1990 births
Living people
Nigerian footballers
Yangon United F.C. players
Association football forwards
Myanmar National League players
Expatriate footballers in Myanmar
Nigerian expatriate footballers
Nigerian expatriate sportspeople in Myanmar
Sportspeople from Ibadan
Nigerian expatriate sportspeople in Laos
Expatriate footballers in Laos